Neil Caldwell (born 25 September 1975 in Glasgow) is a Scottish former footballer who played in defence. Caldwell began his career with Rangers and made one league appearance before his release in 1995. Following his release from Ibrox, Caldwell moved to Dundee United, where he featured in the first four appearances of the season, scoring in the Scottish Challenge Cup match against Cowdenbeath. The goal proved to be Caldwell's only in senior football as, appearing in one further match, his last matchday appearance was as an unused substitute in September 1995.

After leaving United, Caldwell moved to junior side Petershill but left Petershill Park after one season, moving to Rutherglen Glencairn afterwards before retiring.

External links
 

1975 births
Footballers from Glasgow
Living people
Scottish footballers
Scottish Football League players
Rangers F.C. players
Dundee United F.C. players
Association football defenders
Petershill F.C. players
Scottish Junior Football Association players
Rutherglen Glencairn F.C. players